The artistic gymnastics competitions at the 2018 Mediterranean Games in Reus took place between 23 and 26 June at the Pavelló Olímpic de Reus.

Athletes competed in 14 events.

Schedule

Medalists

Men

Women

Medal table

Participating nations
Fifteen nations have registered for artistic gymnastics competitions.

References

External links
2018 Mediterranean Games – Artistic gymnastics

Sports at the 2018 Mediterranean Games
2018
Mediterranean Games